Albert Victor Sterling (died 1945) was a Canadian politician who represented Shellbrook on the Legislative Assembly of the province of Saskatchewan, Canada.

When he died he was replaced in a by-election by Guy Franklin Van Eaton.

References 

1945 deaths
Saskatchewan Co-operative Commonwealth Federation MLAs